Owas Ray Mwape, is a Zambian filmmaker, actor and writer. Highly talented filmmaker, Mwape started his career as an actor and is best known for the roles in Mwansa the Great, Suwi and Fever.

Personal life
He was born in Ndola. He was previously married to popular Zambian songstress, Saboi Imboela. They later divorced where Imboela revealed domestic violence from Owas. However, Owas later denied the allegations and false rumors regarding he and Imboela.

Career
Mwape has won national awards for Best Actor for three years consecutively of 1990, 1991 and 1992, becoming the only Zambian to achieve this winning streak to date. He first starred in the television serial Kabanana from 2004 to 2008. Then he made the acting appearance in several films and serials such as The Lawyer, Redbag, Complicated Affairs, Justice at Stake, The Wife, Mwansa the Great, Chidongo, The ticket, A beautiful Lie and Guilt. In 2013, he founded his own production company 'Owas Films' and turned to full time filmmaking. In 2015, he directed two films Chenda and Secrets Untold where the latter has its premier at Ster Kinekor in Lusaka. 

In 2016, he directed the film Strictly By Invitation which was written by Robam Mwape and produced by Adorah Mwape. The film features the relatives and family members of Mwape family: Clive Mwape, Mercy Mwape, Prudence Mwape, Katongo Mwape, Maxwell Mwape along with Owas, Robam and Adorah.

Filmography

References

External links
 
 Topstar partners with local producer Owas Ray Mwape
 Zathu Highlights – Owas Ray Mwape

Living people
Year of birth missing (living people)
Zambian film directors